Brian Rawling is a British record producer and songwriter. He is the managing director of publisher and production company Metrophonic. Rawling has produced singles and albums for artists such as Cher, with whom he won a Grammy in 1999 for his work on Believe, Tina Turner, Enrique Iglesias, and One Direction.

Discography
Selected production credits
1997: This Could Be Heaven by Pandora
1998: Believe by Cher
1999: Twenty Four Seven by Tina Turner
1999: Enrique by Enrique Iglesias
2000: Lara Fabian by Lara Fabian
2000: Minage by Mónica Naranjo
2000: Renaissance by Lionel Richie
2001: Human by Rod Stewart
2002: Soy Yo by Marta Sánchez
2002: Heathen by David Bowie
2003: Sound of the Underground by Girls Aloud
2005: Relentless by Jo O'Meara
2006: Dreams: The Ultimate Corrs Collection by The Corrs
2008: Greatest Hits by Craig David
2011: Up All Night by One Direction
2012: Fires by Ronan Keating
2013: BZ20 by Boyzone
2015: Colours by Blue
2015: Toujours un ailleurs by Anggun
2019: My Happy Place by Emma Bunton

References

British record producers
British songwriters
Grammy Award winners
Living people
Year of birth missing (living people)
Liverpool Express members